Lomagramma is a genus of ferns in the family Dryopteridaceae, subfamily Elaphoglossoideae, in the Pteridophyte Phylogeny Group classification of 2016 (PPG I).

Taxonomy
Lomagramma was first described by John Smith in 1841. The genus is recognized in the PPG I classification, and, by the Checklist of Ferns and Lycophytes of the World and Plants of the World Online. It has been proposed that the genus should be merged into Bolbitis.

Species
, the Checklist of Ferns and Lycophytes of the World recognized the following species:
Lomagramma angustipinna Copel.
Lomagramma brassii Holttum
Lomagramma brooksii Copel.
Lomagramma copelandii Holttum
Lomagramma cordipinna Holttum
Lomagramma cultrata (Baker) Holttum
Lomagramma leucolepis Holttum
Lomagramma lomarioides (Blume) J.Sm.
Lomagramma melanolepis Alderw.
Lomagramma merrillii Holttum
Lomagramma novoguineensis (Brause) C.Chr.
Lomagramma perakensis Bedd.
Lomagramma polyphylla Brack.
Lomagramma pteroides J.Sm.
Lomagramma sinuata C.Chr.
Lomagramma sorbifolia (Willd.) Ching
Lomagramma sumatrana Alderw.
Lomagramma tahitensis Holttum

References

Dryopteridaceae
Fern genera